Valerică Marius Găman (born 25 February 1989) is a Romanian professional footballer who plays as a central defender for Liga I club CS Universitatea Craiova.

Club career

Universitatea Craiova
He was the captain of Universitatea Craiova and a regular player for Romania U21. In February 2011 he was declared free agent, but in the meantime he signed a new contract with U Craiova, from 1 July 2011. So he played in the Spring of 2011 for Dinamo București, and returned to Craiova in July.

Astra Giurgiu
Following the disaffiliation of Universitatea, Găman was again declared free agent and signed on 3 August 2011 a contract for five years with Astra Giurgiu.

Personal life
He has two brothers, one of them is Robert Irinel who was also a footballer at Universitatea Craiova and the other one is George who is a football referee.

Career statistics

Club

International

International goals

Honours

Club
Astra Giurgiu
Liga I: 2015–16
Cupa României: 2013–14
Supercupa României: 2014

Universitatea Craiova
Supercupa României: 2021

References

External links
 
 
 
 

1989 births
Living people
People from Băilești
Romanian footballers
Association football defenders
Liga I players
FC U Craiova 1948 players
FC Dinamo București players
FC Astra Giurgiu players
FC Steaua București players
Süper Lig players
Kardemir Karabükspor footballers
Saudi Professional League players
Al-Shabab FC (Riyadh) players
CS Universitatea Craiova players
Romania under-21 international footballers
Romania international footballers
UEFA Euro 2016 players
Romanian expatriate footballers
Expatriate footballers in Turkey
Romanian expatriate sportspeople in Turkey
Expatriate footballers in Saudi Arabia
Romanian expatriate sportspeople in Saudi Arabia